Yifat Kariv (born 27 November 1973) is an Israeli politician and social worker. She served as a member of the Knesset for Yesh Atid between 2013 and 2015.

Biography
Born in Beersheba, Kariv attended Bar-Ilan University, where she gained bachelor's and master's degrees in social work. By 2013 she was employed as head of the Youth department at the Ministry for the Development of the Negev and Galilee. She is a prominent social activist for women's rights and improvements in education. In 2008 she was elected to Hod HaSharon city council.

Prior to the 2013 Knesset elections she joined the new Yesh Atid party. She was placed sixteenth on its list, and was elected to the Knesset as the party won 19 seats.

She was placed sixteenth on the party's list again for the 2015 elections, but lost her seat as the party was reduced to eleven seats.

References

External links

1973 births
Politicians from Beersheba
Bar-Ilan University alumni
Israeli social workers
Israeli civil servants
Living people
Members of the 19th Knesset (2013–2015)
Yesh Atid politicians
Women members of the Knesset
21st-century Israeli women politicians